Muhammad Janab Ali Majumdar was a Bengali politician. He served as a member of the Bengal Legislative Assembly.

Early life
He was born into a Bengali Muslim family of Majumdars from Chandpur, which was then under the Tipperah (Comilla) District of the Bengal Presidency.

Career
Majumdar contested in the 1937 Bengal legislative elections, winning in the Chandpur East constituency. In August 1937 however, he was among the 21 members that defected from the leadership of prime minister A. K. Fazlul Huq and his Krishak Praja Party.

References

Bengal MLAs 1937–1945
People from Chandpur District
20th-century Bengalis
Krishak Sramik Party politicians